Tangail-4 is a constituency represented in the Jatiya Sangsad (National Parliament) of Bangladesh since 2017 by Hasan Imam Khan of the Awami League.

Boundaries 
The constituency encompasses Kalihati Upazila.

History 
The constituency was created for the first general elections in newly independent Bangladesh, held in 1973.

Members of Parliament

Elections

Elections in the 2010s 
In late 2014, Abdul Latif Siddiqui was expelled from the Awami League for criticizing the practice of hajj, which he described as a drain on the economy. He resigned from parliament on 1 September 2015. The resulting by-election was delayed by legal wrangling over whether his brother, Abdul Kader Siddique, could be a candidate. The by-election eventually took place in January 2017, and was won by Awami League candidate Hasan Imam Khan.

Abdul Latif Siddiqui was elected unopposed in the 2014 general election after opposition parties withdrew their candidacies in a boycott of the election.

Elections in the 2000s

Elections in the 1990s

References

External links
 

Parliamentary constituencies in Bangladesh
Tangail District